Thelymitra frenchii, commonly called the scarp sun orchid or Jarrahdale sun orchid, is a species of orchid in the family Orchidaceae and endemic to a small area in the south-west of Western Australia. It has a single long, fleshy leaf and up to three relatively small, blue flowers.

Description
The side lobes have toothbrush-like tufts of white hairs. The flowers remain open even in cool weather and until late in the day. Flowering has only been observed in October.

Taxonomy and naming
Thelymitra frenchii was first formally described in 2004 by Jeff Jeanes from a specimen collected near Jarrahdale and the description was published in Muelleria. The specific epithet (frenchii) honours "Christopher (Chris) J. French" for his assistance to the author.

Distribution and habitat
The scarp sun orchid grows in soil pockets on granite outcrops in jarrah forest. It is only known from near Jarrahdale in the Jarrah Forest biogeographic region.

Conservation
Thelymitra frenchii is classified as "not threatened" by the Western Australian Government Department of Parks and Wildlife.

References

External links

frenchii
Endemic orchids of Australia
Orchids of Western Australia
Plants described in 2004